Rekord is the ninth full-length studio album by German hip hop group Die Fantastischen Vier. It was released on 24 October 2014, marking the 25th anniversary of the group.

Musical content
On the album, which mainly contains hip hop and pop songs, Fanta 4 also experiment with the styles of Dubstep ("Heute", "Wie geliebt") and R'n'B ("Lass sehen"). A reviewer in Frankfurter Allgemeine Zeitung said that the band's performance on this album shows "Unbeirrbarkeit, Humor und einem großen Gespür für die Haken" ("imperturbability, humor and a great sense of the hook"), and hails the "Fantastic Four" as pioneers of hip-hop.

Writing and production
For the anniversary song "25" Don Snow a.k.a. Jonn Savannah sang his hit "25 Years" with a slightly different text. "Disco" features Miss Platnum.

Release and reception
Rekord was published on 24 October 2014. From the album, the titles "Und los", "25", and "Single" were released as singles.

The album peaked at number one of the German charts a week after publication, was awarded gold and sold more than 200,000 copies.

On laut.de, it was rated with 3 out of 5 stars.

Track listing

Charts

Weekly charts

Year-end charts

References

Die Fantastischen Vier albums
2014 albums